Triple Z is a French cartoon that aired during 1998 and 2000. It was rerun on an Italian channel in 2005. It was also aired on the German Super RTL channel in 2002. The show had around 52 episodes in total.

The show was produced by Animage Studios.

Synopsis
Through no fault of their own, Zero and Zanzibar, the Pompeii amphitheater's star gladiators, find themselves transported into the future onto a Hollywood lot right in the middle of the shoot of a Hercules movie. There, they meet Zazie and, with her, they become LA's hottest stunt team: the "Triple Z." In the air or full fathom deep, on land or on sea, heavy duty stuntmen Zazie, Zero and Zanzibar eschew no risk for the greater glory of the silver screen. Their names figure on the credits of every major blockbuster.

Episodes
Le Grand Voyage
Ville Fantôme
Le Secret Du Bouclier Magique
Les Diamants Du Proconsul
Le Vrai Visage Des Ratapok
Le Cirque Des Barnabos
À l'Attaque De Frankenstein
La Prisonnière De Costa Pueblo
Naufrage À Hawaï
Le Tombeau De Cléopâtre
Drame En Haute Montagne
Traquenard À Las Vegas
Cannonball
La Nuit Des Oscars
Cratero
Rendez-Vous À La Maison Blanche
La Vallée Interdite
l'Autobus En Folie
La Vedette A Disparu
Piège Dans Les Airs
Ratapokus Et Lenfera
Le Ranch Des Trois Bisons
Palace En Feu
Le Château Du Pirate
Au Secours De Jessica
Les Aventures Du Sphinx
Le Tournoi Maudit
Le Sauvetage d'Aquarius 5
Le Nez De Cléopâtre
Vol 421 En Péril
Broadway Melody
Le Fantôme De Carnegie
Agent Spécial 777
Les Ferrets De La Reine
Les Disparus De Beverly Hills
Le Mariage De Gloriane Grant
Mais Qu'est-Il Arrivé À Zazie?
À Chacun Son Histoire
La Terre Tremble À Frisco
La Statuette Volée
Alerte À La Pollution
Titanic II
Le Masque D'argent
Men In White
Le Retour De Zorro
Halloween À Hollywood
Mistigri Et Mistigri
Le Gala Des Étoiles
Le Jeu De La Vérité
Le Roi De La Jungle
Banqueroute Chez Vertigo
Folie À Hollywood

External links
http://www.ab-international.com/catalogue_2006/detail_en.asp?Code=300# [the video link contains the only footage I could have found online ]
Episode list (in German)
http://www.tvfrance-intl.com/en/annuaire/forms/catalogue/ficheprogramme.php?fpg_id=2594&lang=en (in French)

French children's animated television series
1990s French animated television series
2000s French animated television series
1998 French television series debuts
2000 French television series endings
Fictional trios